The La Troienne Stakes is a Grade I American Thoroughbred horse race for fillies and mares, age four and older, over a distance of  miles  held annually in early May on the Kentucky Oaks day meeting at Churchill Downs in Louisville, Kentucky  during the spring meeting. The current purse is $500,000.

History

The event was inaugurated on May 3, 1986, on Kentucky Derby Day as the Louisville Budweiser Breeders' Cup Handicap at a distance of  miles for three-year-olds and older and was won by the favorite, five-year-old gelding Hopeful Word in small field of four starters.

The following year the event's conditions were changed to fillies & mares that were four years old or older.

The event with Budweiser and Breeders' Cup sponsorship and added incentives to base purses attracted good quality runners. The event was classified as a Grade III in 1988 and it was upgraded once more in 1990.
The event was renamed to Louisville Breeders' Cup Stakes in 2007, Louisville Stakes in 2008 and Louisville Distaff Stakes in 2009. In 2010 the race was renamed after the famous broodmare La Troienne to the La Troienne Stakes.

This event was upgraded to a Grade I for its 2014.

Of the more notable runnings of this event was the 2010 edition which saw the heavily favored 2009 US Horse of the Year Rachel Alexandra returning to Churchill Downs for the first time since her 2009 Kentucky Oaks victory trying to lead all the way but was defeated by Unbridled Belle by a head.
The 1996 winner Escena went on to win the Breeders' Cup Distaff and become US Champion Older Female Horse. The 2008 winner Ginger Punch won this event easily as the reigning 2007 US Champion Older Female Horse as an overwhelming favorite.

Records
Speed  record
 1:42.09 – Authenticity (2013)

 Margins
  lengths – You (2003)

Most wins
 No horse has won this race more than once.

Most wins by a jockey
 5 – Calvin Borel (1997, 1999, 2004, 2007, 2009)

Most wins by an owner
 2 – Allen E. Paulson (1992, 1998)
 2 – John A. Franks (1997, 1999)
 2 – The Thoroughbred Corporation (2001, 2002)

Winners

Notes:

† Inaugural event in 1986 the conditions of the event were for horses three years old and older

See also
 List of American and Canadian Graded races

References

Grade 1 stakes races in the United States
Graded stakes races in the United States
Mile category horse races for fillies and mares
Recurring sporting events established in 1986
Churchill Downs horse races
1986 establishments in Kentucky